Klaus Merz, (born 3 October 1945 in Aarau, canton Aargau) is a Swiss writer.

Life 
As a teacher (secondary school), Merz has worked in adult education. He has won several prices, e.g. the famous Hermann Hesse Prize for Literature in 1997, the „Gottfried Keller-Preis“ in 2004 and the „Werkpreis der schweizerischen Schillerstiftung“ in 2005.

He wrote a lot of narrations and stories, e.g. „Adams Kostüm“ or the short novel „Jakob schläft“. Merz has also made poems („Kurze Durchsage“) – his works are rather short. But the titles already show Merz’s special ability: He manages it, to place two or three banal words, one next to the other, and it starts “buzzing” amongst them.

Today, Merz lives in Unterkulm as a narrator and lyric poet.

Selected bibliography 

Mit gesammelter Blindheit. Gedichte. Tschudy, St. Gallen 1967.
Geschiebe – mein Land. Gedichte. Sauerländer, Aarau 1969.
Vier Vorwände ergeben kein Haus. Gedichte. Artemis, Zürich 1972.
Obligatorische Übung. Geschichten. Sauerländer, Aarau 1975.
Latentes Material. Erzählungen. Sauerländer, Aarau 1978.
Der Entwurf. Erzählung. AutorenEdition, München 1982.
Landleben. Geschichten. Howeg, Zürich 1982.
Bootsvermietung. Prosa, Gedichte. Howeg, Zürich 1985.
Tremolo Trümmer. Erzählungen. Ammann, Zürich 1988.
Nachricht vom aufrechten Gang. Prosa, Gedichte. Howeg, Zürich 1991.
Am Fuss des Kamels. Geschichten & Zwischengeschichten. Haymon, Innsbruck 1994.
Kurze Durchsage. Gedichte & Prosa. Nachwort von Werner Morlang. Haymon, Innsbruck 1995.
Jakob schläft. Eigentlich ein Roman. Nachwort von Peter von Matt. Haymon, Innsbruck 1997, Fischer Taschenbuch, Frankfurt am Main 2006
Kommen Sie mit mir ans Meer, Fräulein? Roman. Haymon, Innsbruck 1998.
Garn. Prosa und Gedichte. Haymon, Innsbruck 2000.
Adams Kostüm. Drei Erzählungen. Haymon, Innsbruck 2001.
Das Turnier der Bleistiftritter. Achtzehn Begegnungen. Nachwort von Markus Kutter. Haymon, Innsbruck 2003.
Die Tiere ziehen los! Eine Entdeckungsreise in die Fluss-Auen. Bilderbuch (mit Petra Rappo). Atlantis, Zürich 2003.
Löwen Löwen. Venezianische Spiegelungen. Haymon, Innsbruck 2004.
Los. Eine Erzählung. Haymon, Innsbruck 2005.
Kunos große Fahrt. Bilderbuch (mit Hannes Binder). NordSüd, Gossau 2005.
Priskas Miniaturen. Zwanzig Erzählungen 1978–1988. Nachwort von Werner Morlang. Haymon, Innsbruck 2005.
Der gestillte Blick. Sehstücke. Haymon, Innsbruck 2007.
Der Argentinier. Novelle. Pinselzeichnungen von Heinz Egger. Haymon, Innsbruck 2009.
Aussicht mit Zimmer. Texte zu Fotos von Stephan Schenk. Steidl, Göttingen 2009.
Aus dem Staub. Gedichte. Haymon, Innsbruck 2010.
Unerwarteter Verlauf. Gedichte. Haymon, Innsbruck 2013.
Helios Transport. Gedichte. Haymon, Innsbruck 2016.
Flüsterndes Licht. Ein Kettengedicht. Gemeinsam mit Nora Gomringer, Marco Grosse, Annette Hagemann und Ulrich Koch. Haymon, Innsbruck 2017.
firma. Prosa Gedichte. Mit acht Pinselzeichnungen von Heinz Egger. Haymon, Innsbruck-Wien 2019.

Complete edition 

 Band 1: Die Lamellen stehen offen. Frühe Lyrik 1963–1991. Haymon, Innsbruck 2011.
 Band 2: In der Dunkelkammer. Frühe Prosa 1971–1982. Haymon, Innsbruck 2011.
 Band 3: Fährdienst. Prosa 1983–1995. Haymon, Innsbruck 2012.
 Band 4: Der Mann mit der Tür oder Vom Nutzen des Unnützen. Feuilletons. Haymon, Innsbruck 2013.
 Band 5: Das Gedächtnis der Bilder. Texte zu Malerei und Fotografie. Haymon, Innsbruck 2014.
 Band 6: Brandmale des Glücks. Prosa 1996–2014. Haymon, Innsbruck 2014.
 Band 7: Außer Rufweite. Lyrik 1992–2013. Haymon, Innsbruck 2015.

Awards 

 1979: Prize of the Schiller Foundation, Switzerland (Latentes Material)
 1992: Literature Prize Aargau, Switzerland
 1996: Solothurner Literaturpreis, Switzerland
 1997: Prize of the Schiller Foundation, Switzerland (Jakob schläft)
 1997: Hermann-Hesse-Literaturpreis, Karlsruhe, Germany (Jakob schläft)
 1999: Prix Littéraire Lipp (Frère Jacques)
 2004: Gottfried-Keller-Preis, Zurich, Switzerland
 2005: Prize of the Schiller Foundation, Switzerland (Los)
 2005: Culture Prize Aargau
 Book Prize Zurich 1992, 1994, 1997, 2001, 2005, 2010
 2012: Poetry Prize Basel
 2012: Friedrich-Hölderlin-Preis, Bad Homburg, Germany
 2016: Rainer-Malkowski-Preis, Academy of Fine Arts, Munich, Germany
 2018: Christine Lavant Prize, Vienna, Austria

Film 

 Merzluft. documentary about Klaus Merz. Cast: Melinda Nadj Abonji, Peter von Matt, Manfred Papst, Markus Bundi, Robert Hunger-Bühler and Heinz Egger. Director: Heinz Bütler. Production: Pixiu Films, 2015.

External links

References 

Swiss male poets
1945 births
Living people
People from Aarau